Autonomism, also known as autonomist Marxism is an anti-capitalist left-wing political and social movement and theory. As a theoretical system, it first emerged in Italy in the 1960s from workerism.

George Katsiaficas summarizes the forms of autonomous movements saying that "In contrast to the centralized decisions and hierarchical authority structures of modern institutions, autonomous social movements involve people directly in decisions affecting their everyday lives, seeking to expand democracy and help individuals break free of political structures and behavior patterns imposed from the outside". This has involved a call for the independence of social movements from political parties in a revolutionary perspective which seeks to create a practical political alternative to both authoritarian/state socialism and contemporary representative democracy.

Autonomism influenced the German and Dutch /, the worldwide social centre movement and today is influential in Italy, France and to a lesser extent the English-speaking countries. Those who describe themselves as autonomists now vary from Marxists to anarchists.

Theory 

Early theorists such as Mario Tronti, Antonio Negri, Sergio Bologna and Paolo Virno developed notions of "immaterial" and "social labour" that extended the Marxist concept of labour to all society. They suggested that modern society's wealth was produced by unaccountable collective work, and that only a little of this was redistributed to the workers in the form of wages. Other Italian autonomists—particularly feminists, such as Mariarosa Dalla Costa and Silvia Federici—emphasised the importance of feminism and the value of unpaid female labour to capitalist society. Micheal Ryan, a scholar of the movement, writes:

Antonio Negri and Michael Hardt argue that network power constructs are the most effective methods of organization against the neoliberal regime of accumulation and predict a massive shift in the dynamics of capital into a 21st century empire.

By country

France 

In the 1980s, the autonomist movement underwent a deep crisis in Italy because of effective prosecution by the State, and was stronger in Germany than in France. It remained present in Parisian squats and in some riots (for example in 1980 near the Jussieu Campus in Paris, or in 1982 in the Ardennes department during anti-nuclear demonstrations). From 1986 to 1994 the French group  occupied several buildings of the French national social housing authority to denounce the cruel lack of lodging for workers, they were several hundred and took their decisions in democratic assembly, with support from all autonomous groups of Paris, many of them were worked on the anti prison . It was also involved in the alter-globalisation movement and above all in the solidarity with illegal foreigners (Collective Des Papiers pour tous ("Permits for all", 1996) and Collectif Anti-Expulsion (1998–2005)). Several autonomist journals date from this time: Quilombo (1988–93), Apache (1990–98), Tic-Tac (1995–97), Karoshi (1998–99), and Tiqqun (1999–2001).

West Germany
In West Germany,  was used during the late 1970s to depict the most radical part of the political left.

Italy
On 11 March 1977, riots took place in Bologna following the killing of student Francesco Lorusso by police. Beginning in 1979, the state effectively prosecuted the autonomist movement, accusing it of protecting the Red Brigades, which had kidnapped and assassinated Aldo Moro. 12,000 far-left activists were detained; 600 fled the country, including 300 to France and 200 to South America.

Influence 
The autonomist Marxist and  movements provided inspiration to some on the revolutionary left in English-speaking countries, particularly among anarchists, many of whom have adopted autonomist tactics. The Italian  movement also influenced Marxist academics such as Harry Cleaver, John Holloway, Steve Wright and Nick Dyer-Witheford. In Denmark and Sweden, the word is used as a catch-all phrase for anarchists and the extra-parliamentary left in general, as was seen in the media coverage of the eviction of the  squat in Copenhagen in March 2007.

Thinkers 
 Franco "Bifo" Berardi
 George Caffentzis
 Harry Cleaver
 Silvia Federici
 Michael Hardt
 John Holloway
 Antonio Negri
 Mario Tronti
 Paolo Virno
 Nick Dyer-Witheford
 Maurizio Lazzarato

Movements and organizations 
 Abahlali baseMjondolo, Shack dweller's movement in South Africa
 Blitz (Norway)
 Disobbedienti (ex Tute Bianche)
 Homeless Workers' Movement MTST
 Kämpa tillsammans!, a communist group in Malmö and Gothenburg.
 London Autonomists
 Plan C, a British anti-authoritarian communist group inspired by autonomism.
 Swedish Anarcho-syndicalist Youth Federation
 Ungdomshuset, Danish autonomist squat
 Zapatista Army of National Liberation

Publications 
 Aufheben
 Collegamenti-Wobbly
 Multitudes magazine
 ROAR Magazine

See also 

 Affective labor
 Autonome Nationalisten
 Autonomy
 Direct democracy
 Horizontalidad
 Kommune 1
 Leaderless resistance
 Libertarian Marxism
 Open Marxism
 Popular assembly
 Revolutionary spontaneity
 Sovereign citizen movement
 Sui iuris
 Temporary Autonomous Zone

References

Bibliography

Further reading 
  L’Autonomie. Le mouvement autonome en France et en Italie, éditions Spartacus 1978
  Autonomes, Jan Bucquoy and Jacques Santi, ANSALDI 1985
  Action Directe. Du terrorisme français à l'euroterrorisme, Alain Hamon and Jean-Charles Marchand, SEUIL 1986
  Paroles Directes. Légitimité, révolte et révolution : autour d'Action Directe, Loïc Debray, Jean-Pierre Duteuil, Philippe Godard, Henri Lefebvre, Catherine Régulier, Anne Sveva, Jacques Wajnsztejn, ACRATIE 1990
  Un Traître chez les totos, Guy Dardel, ACTES SUD 1999 (novel)
  Bac + 2 + crime : l'affaire Florence Rey, Frédéric Couderc, CASTELLS 1998
  Italie 77. Le « Mouvement », les intellectuels, Fabrizio Calvi, Seuil 1977
  L'operaismo degli anni Sessanta. Da 'Quaderni rossi' a 'classe operaia''', Giuseppe Trotta e Fabio Milana edd., Deriveapprod I 2008
  Una sparatoria tranquilla. Per una storia orale del '77, Ordadek 1997
  Die Autonomen, Thomas Schultze et Almut Gross, Konkret Literatur 1997
  Autonome in Bewegung, AG Grauwacke aus den ersten 23 Jahren, Association A 2003
  
  Negativity and Revolution: Adorno and Political Activism London: Pluto Press, 2009 John Holloway ed. with Fernando Matamoros & Sergio Tischler 
  Os Cangaceiros A Crime Called Freedom: The Writings of Os Cangaceiros (Volume One) Eberhardt Press 2006
  Νοέμβρης 73. Αυτοί οι αγώνες συνεχίζονται, δεν εξαγοράζονται, δεν δικαιώθηκαν, ed. Αυτόνομη Πρωτοβουλία Πολιτών. Athens 1983.
  Αναμνήσεις, Άγης Στίνας, υψιλον, Αθήνα 1985
  Το επαναστατικό πρόβλημα σήμερα, Κορνήλιος Καστοριάδης, υψιλον, Αθήνα 2000
 (In English) The city is ours: Squatting and autonomous movements from the 1970s to the present.'' Ed. Bart van der Steen, Ask Katzeff, Leendert van Hoogenhuijze. PM press, 2014.

External links 
 Texts on autonomism from Libcom.org

 
Criticism of work
Economic ideologies
Far-left politics
Far-left politics in Italy
History of political thought
History of socialism
History of social movements
Labour movement
Libertarian socialism
Marxism
Marxist theory
Types of socialism
Modern history of Italy